Workum is a city located in the municipality of Súdwest-Fryslân in Friesland, Netherlands. It received city rights in 1399 and is one of the eleven cities of Friesland. It had a population of 4,435 in January 2017.

Overview
Nowadays, Workum is probably best known for having a museum dedicated to the very popular artist Jopie Huisman. There are four windmills in Workum; De Nijlânnermolen, De Snip, Het Heidenschap and Ybema's Molen.

Notable people
 Aeint Herman de Boer, Dutch businessman who was the owner of Hotel de Boer in Medan, Dutch East Indies
 Hotze Koch, 22 October 1867,  founder of the Quanah Tribune-Chief newspaper
 Kim H. Veltman (born 1948), Dutch-Canadian historian of science
 Sybrand Buma (born 1965), Dutch politician
 Jopie Huisman (1922–2000), painter.

Gallery

References

External links

Cities in the Netherlands
Cities in Friesland
Populated places in Friesland
Súdwest-Fryslân